Diamond Corner is an unincorporated community in Burke Township, Pipestone County, Minnesota, United States.

Notes

Unincorporated communities in Pipestone County, Minnesota
Unincorporated communities in Minnesota